The Minister of Petroleum and Minerals is a senior member of the Constitutional Government of East Timor heading the Ministry of Petroleum and Minerals.

Functions
Under the Constitution of East Timor, the Minister has the power and the duty:

Where the Minister is in charge of the subject matter of a government statute, the Minister is also required, together with the Prime Minister, to sign the statute.

Incumbent
The incumbent Minister of Petroleum and Minerals is Víctor da Conceição Soares.

List of Ministers 
The following individuals have been appointed as the Minister:

References

External links
  – official site  

East Timor
Petroleum and Minerals
East Timor